Amir Baram (born 22 July 1969) is an Israeli general (aluf) who serves as the Deputy Chief of General Staff of the IDF

He previously served as the commander of the Northern Command, commander of the IDF Military Colleges, commander of the 91st Division, commander of 98th Paratroopers Division and commander of the Paratroopers Brigade.

Early life and Education 
Baram, son of Yitzhak Baram, grew up in Ra'anana. Studied at the Reali School in Haifa and was a trainee at the "Military Command" Boarding School, which he graduated with honors

Military service

Baram was drafted into the IDF in 1988. He joined the Paratroopers Brigade. He served as a soldier and a squad leader. He became an infantry officer after completing Officer Candidate School and return to the Paratroopers Brigade as a platoon leader. During his career Baram led the Brigade's Anti-tank company and the Brigade's Reconnaissance company in counter-guerrilla operations in South Lebanon and Commanded 890 "Efe" (Echis) paratroop battalion during Operation Defensive Shield, and later led Maglan Unit in counter-terror operations in the Second Intifada.

Afterwards, he commanded the Shomron Regional Brigade and later on a reserve Paratroopers Brigade. Baram was then given command of the 35th Paratroopers Brigade. Later commanded the 98th Paratroopers Division and the 91st Division. In 2017 he was promoted to the rank of aluf (Major general) and was given command on the IDF Military Colleges
and the Northern Corps. In 2019 he was chosen to be the next commander of the IDF's Northern Command.

Awards and decorations 
Baram was awarded three campaign ribbons for his service during three conflicts.

Personal life 
Baram lives in Bnei Dror, is married to Galit and has three children. Graduate of the IDF Command and Staff College and the Royal College of Defense Studies. Has a bachelor's degree in law from the Reichman University, and a master's degree in international relations from King's College London.

References

1969 births
Israeli generals
Living people
Israeli military personnel